The Rookworst (smoked sausage)  is a type of Dutch sausage in which ground meat is mixed with spices and salt and stuffed into a casing (originally made of intestine, but these days usually made of bovine collagen). Described as a Bologna-type sausage, it is common in the Netherlands and is also exported to Great Britain. the Rookworst is a traditional ingredient in the stamppot. 

Typical Dutch rookworst is made with pork, but in recent years, turkey-based rookworst is available in most Dutch supermarkets. Rookworst was traditionally smoked over smouldering woodchips. Today, most commercially available rookworst is not smoked, but has smoke aromatics added to give the characteristic flavour. Glucono delta-lactone is added to lower the pH and add to shelf life.

There are two types of rookworst:
The most common form of rookworst is a cooked sausage, sold in a vacuum pack. As this sausage leaves the factory already cooked, it is shelf-stable for weeks, and only needs to be reheated. This type of rookworst is also called Gelderse rookworst, i.e., rookworst from (or in the manner of) Gelderland.
Raw rookworst — also known as crafted, old-fashioned or butchers' rookworst — contains raw meats, and has to be prepared properly. Often this type of rookworst still uses natural intestine for the casing instead of bovine collagen. As the meat is raw, this type needs to be cooked before it can be safely eaten. A common method is to simmer the rookworst.

A recipe from a Dutch cookbook of 1940 gives the proportions of ground meat as 4 parts of pork to 3 parts of veal and 3 parts of bacon. The mixture is salted and saltpeter, sugar and nutmeg are added before the meat is forced into pig intestines. The sausages are air-dried at 12 to 15 degrees C and then smoked at 18 to 20 degrees C.

See also

 List of smoked foods

References

External links 
 

Dutch sausages
Dutch cuisine
Dutch words and phrases
Smoked meat